Billie Jean King was the defending champion and she won in the final 6–3, 7–5 against Alycia Moulton. It was King's last singles tournament title of her career and she became the oldest WTA player to win a singles tournament at 39 years, 7 months and 23 days.

Seeds
A champion seed is indicated in bold text while text in italics indicates the round in which that seed was eliminated. The top eight seeds received a bye to the second round.

  Billie Jean King (champion)
  Zina Garrison (semifinals)
  Rosalyn Fairbank (third round)
  Evonne Cawley (third round)
  Kathy Jordan (second round)
  Yvonne Vermaak (quarterfinals)
  Andrea Leand (second round)
  Wendy White-Prausa (second round)
  Manuela Maleeva (first round)
  Ann Kiyomura (first round)
  Beth Herr (third round)
 n/a
  Anne White (semifinals)
 n/a
  Alycia Moulton (final)
  Betty Stöve (first round)

Draw

Finals

Top half

Section 1

Section 2

Bottom half

Section 3

Section 4

References

External links
 1983 Edgbaston Cup Draw (Archived 2009-08-14)

Edgbaston Cup - Singles, 1983
Singles